Trebouxiaceae is a family of green algae in the order Trebouxiales.

References

Trebouxiophyceae families
Trebouxiales